Hans Hess may refer to:
Hans Hess (bobsleigh) (born 1902), participated at the 1928 Winter Olympics
Hans Hess (Swiss politician) (born 1945), member of the Swiss Council of States since 1988
 Hans Hess (museologist) (1907–1975), curator of York Art Gallery